The Chicago Studebaker Flyers (also known as the Chicago Studebakers) were a National Basketball League team from 1942 to 1943. They were funded by the United Auto Workers and replaced George Halas's Chicago Bruins, who folded in 1942.

During the 1942–1943 NBL season, the Studebakers and the Toledo Jim White Chevrolets became the first teams in the league to racially integrate. The Studebakers did so by signing six former Harlem Globetrotters: Tony Peyton, Duke Cumberland, Bernie Price, Sonny Boswell, Roosie Hudson, and Hillery Brown. Though some claimed that the former Globetrotters experienced racism from their white teammates, coach Johnny Jordan insisted that "there was no strife", adding, "All the blacks were treated well by players and fans. People knew the Globetrotters were great ballplayers. They were well received."

References